is a Shinto Shrine in Shimamoto, Osaka

The Shrine is dedicated to the veneration of the kami of Emperor Go-Toba, Emperor Tsuchimikado and Emperor Juntoku.   In the struggle with the Kamakura shogunate, the three historical figures are united by one common factor—each was overpowered and banished from the Imperial center in Kyoto: Go-Toba was banished to Oki Island, where he died. Tsuchimikado felt compelled to abandon Kyoto, traveling first to Tosa province (now known as Kōchi Prefecture); and later, he removed himself to Awa province, where he died in exile. Juntoku was forced to end his days at Sado Island.
In 1873, the kami of Go-Daigo and Tushimikado were enshrined, and the kami of Juntoku was enshrined in 1874.

Kanpei-sha
In 1871, the  identified the hierarchy of government-supported shrines most closely associated with the Imperial family.  The kampeisha were shrines venerated by the imperial family.  This category encompasses those sanctuaries enshrining emperors, imperial family members, or meritorious retainers of the Imperial family.  Up through 1940, the mid-range of Imperial shrines or  included  the shrine; and it was then known as Minase-gū In 1940, Minase's status was changed , which is the highest rank; and since then, it has been known as Minase jingū.

See also
 List of Jingū
 Modern system of ranked Shinto Shrines
 List of National Treasures of Japan (ancient documents)

Notes

References
 Bornoff, Niholas. (2005). National Geographic Traveler Japan. Washington, D.C.: National Geographic Society.
 Brownlee, John S. (1991). Political Thought in Japanese Historical Writing: From Kojiki (712) to Tokushi Yoron (1712). Waterloo, Ontario: Wilfrid Laurier University Press. 
 Holton, Daniel Clarence. (1922). The Political Philosophy of Modern Shintō, a Study of the State Religion of Japan. Chicago: University of Chicago Libraries.  OCLC 2857479
 Ponsonby-Fane, Richard Arthur Brabazon. (1959).  The Imperial House of Japan. Kyoto: Ponsonby Memorial Society. OCLC 194887
 ___. (1962).  Studies in Shinto and Shrines. Kyoto: Ponsonby Memorial Society. OCLC 399449
 ___. (1963).  The Vicissitudes of Shinto. Kyoto: Ponsonby Memorial Society.  
 Takekoshi, Yosaburō. (2004). The Economic Aspects of the History of the Civilization of Japan, Volume 1. London: Taylor & Francis. 

Jingū
Shinto shrines in Osaka Prefecture
Important Cultural Properties of Japan
Emperor Go-Toba
Kanpei-taisha
Beppyo shrines